The Battle of Ganja, Siege of Ganja Fortress or Assault on Ganja, was the result of a Russian offensive in the South Caucasus intended to conquer the Ganja Khanate of Qajar Iran, which contributed to the escalation of the Russo-Persian War (1804–1813).

Prologue

After decision of Tsar Paul to annex Georgia (December 1800) and, after Paul's assassination (11 March 1801), the activist policy followed by his successor, Alexander I, aimed at establishing Russian control over the khanates of the eastern Caucasus. In 1803, the newly appointed commander of Russian forces in the Caucasus, Paul Tsitsianov, attacked Ganja. After Mohammad Khan Qajar invasion of Tbilisi, which Javad Khan fought alongside Agha Muḥammad Khān, Tsitsianov wrote a letter to Javad Khan, demanding a voluntary surrender:

Javad Khan answered:

After this response, the Russian troops moved forward and opened gunfire. Javad Khan defended heroically and the siege lasted a month, Tsitsianov renewed demands to surrender for five times, but to no avail."I'll take the fortress and I will deliver thee to death," - he wrote and the stubborn Khan answered: "You'll find me dead on the fortress wall !", and both vowed to fulfil his promises. Finally, the 14th in January 1804, the Russian council of war decided to do: "Be the assault the next day".

Battle

Tsitsianov divided the Russian troops into two columns, one was entrusted to Major-General Portnyagin (Karabagh gate) and the other to Colonel Pavel Karyagin (Tbilisi Gate). Early morning (5.00 am), January 15, the column of Portnyagin, approached the Karabagh gate and pierced a hole in the ground before the wall, but as the defenders focused their main forces there Portnyagin left it aside and stormed the ramparts with ladders. The resistance he met was so great that the Russian troops resumed the attack twice, and twice were repulsed with considerable loss. Then Portniagin rushed himself at the head of the column and first went to the wall, followed by a Lieutenant of the regiment of the Narva that fell, struck by several bullets. Then Major Bartenev of Caucasus Grenadier Regiment fell and finally, it was Lieutenant Colonel Simanovich Grenadiers that managed to climb the stairs to the wall and help out Portnyagina. Meanwhile, the second column, led by Colonel Karyagin, ascended the wall from the gate of Tbilisi, and took possession of the main tower. The other two towers were taken one by one by major Lisanevich. Javad Khan, who did not want to seek safety in flight, took the gun and sword in hand and defended himself until he has been killed by captain Kalovski, who himself was immediately killed by the defenders. Khan's death brought confusion into the ranks of the defenders, but they still showed resistance and piled heavy stones.

The city at this time was in terrible confusion. Crowds of the people, on horse and foot, rushed in disorder on the streets, vainly searching for the already deceased Khan. residents hid in their homes and barns, women filled the air with frantic cries. Meanwhile, Russian soldiers with bayonets cleared the street, entirely covered with dead bodies. By noon the battle began to subside, and broke again only for a moment when, according to Tstsianov, the soldiers came upon five hundred men, who have entrenched themselves in the Juma mosque. At first they offered to surrender, but when one Armenian said that among them are some Lezgins, it was the signal for the death of all defenders, because the hatred of Lezghins was so strong among the Russian troops.

Tsitsianov deeply appreciated the effort of the soldiers in the capture of the fortress and wrote:"...this is proof of moral superiority of Russian Empire over Persians and that spirit of confidence in the victory, will feed and warm up the soldiers that I consider as my first purpose".

The elder son of Javad Khan, Hossein Quli khan, was also killed during the battle, the rest of the khan's family was taken prisoner and years later (1812) were given permission to go to Iran via Baku. His younger son, Ughurlu, survived, went to Iran and later fought the Russian Empire when the Iranians attacked Ganja in the second Russo-Persian war.

Massacre
Various Persian and western historians have written on the dimensions of the massacre that took place after the fall of the city. Etemad ol saltane (an Iranian historian) states that the massacre that ensued after the battle continued for three days, Hedayat has a more accurate time of three hours, Abbasgulu Bakikhanov mentions the massacre but does not give more information. It is estimated that about 1,500-3,000 men died.

Shah's response
At the beginning of the battle, Javad khan sent a messenger to Fath Ali Shah and asked reinforcement. Shah gathered a 30,000 strong force and sent them to Ganja, but the force did not reach the Ganja in time because of the coldness of January and also because Hossein Khan Sardar, the governor khan of the Erevan Khanate had rebelled against the Shah and only one letter carrier, Saied Bayk, reached the town in time.

Aftermath

Taking Ganja was an event of extraordinary importance because it was considered a fortress key to the northern provinces of Persia. Thereafter, Tsitsianov change the name of the city to Yelizavetpol, after empress consort Elizabeth Alexeievna, the wife of tsarAlexander I of Russia. Referring to the place by its old name became a crime punishable by a fine, the main mosque was turned into a church, and Russian law replaced Islamic law. However, as Swietochowski notes, the name never found acceptance amongst the Azerbaijanis, who continued to call the town Ganja.

Javad Khan's surviving wives and relatives who had not escaped to Iran (as had most of his sons) were arrested. They were held as prisoners in the citadel until 1812, when they were freed by Tsitsianov's successor Philip Paulucci, who held the view that Javad Khan was a valiant man who died fighting to defend his interests.

With Tsitianov's attack on Ganja, the Iranians saw a direct invasion of their country's territory. The issue was now no longer to impose tribute on the Lezgins or about re-asserting Persian domination over Christian Georgia, which had happened several years before; now, the integrity of Shi'ite Iran itself had been violated by the invasion of the town of Ganja.

Immigration

Two years after the Russian occupation of Ganja, Ugurlu khan, the son of Javad khan, with the assistance of crown prince Abbas Mirza, moved many inhabitants of Ganja across the Iranian border, and the protection of 6,000 families of inhabitants of Ganja was entrusted to Pir-Gholi khan Qajar, who moved them to Tabriz. Then in 1809, the Borchali and Ayrumlu tribes of Ganja moved to Nakhchivan, where they were renamed to Qarapapaq (Black hat in Azeri language), and finally after Nakhchivan was ceded to Russia, they went to Solduz (Naqadeh) in Iranian West Azerbaijan Province. Other main places of Qarapapaq residence are the provinces of Ardahan (around Lake Çıldır), Kars and Iğdır in Turkey.

Notes

a. Iranian historians like Donbuli, blames the Armenians of Ganja and Nasib beg Shams-od-dinlu for the fall of the fortress and accuse the Armenians for opening the gate for capturing the tower .

See also

 Ganja Fortress

References

Sources

External links
 THE SIEGE AND ASSAULT of Fortress Ganja

Ganja 1804
Ganja 1804
1804 in the Russian Empire
Ganja 1804
1804 in Iran
History of Ganja, Azerbaijan
November 1803 events
December 1803 events
January 1804 events